Matthis Lebel (born 25 March 1999) is a French rugby player, who plays as a wing for Toulouse and the France national team.

International career

International tries

Honours

Toulouse
 European Rugby Champions Cup: 2018–19, 2020–21
 Top 14: 2020-21

France
 Six Nations Championship: 2022

France U20
World Rugby Under 20 Championship: 2018, 2019
Six Nations Under 20s Championship: 2018

References

External links
France Rugby profile 
Toulouse profile
L'Équipe profile

1999 births
Living people
France international rugby union players
Rugby union players from Toulouse
French rugby union players
Stade Toulousain players
Rugby union wings